Roger Diercken (born 9 February 1939) is a Belgian former racing cyclist. He won the Tour de Pologne in 1960. He was born in Tielen, his profession is a postal worker.

References

External links
 

1939 births
Living people
Belgian male cyclists
Cyclists from Antwerp Province
People from Kasterlee